The 2014–2015 international cricket season was from October 2014 to April 2015.

Season overview

Rankings
The following are the rankings at the beginning of the season.

October

Australia vs Pakistan in the United Arab Emirates

West Indies in India

Tour was cancelled after the 4th ODI at Dharamshala. The West Indies tour of India in October was  originally scheduled to consist of three Test matches, five One Day International matches and one Twenty20 International match. During the 4th ODI, the rest of the tour was cancelled due to a pay dispute between the West Indies players, the West Indies Cricket Board and the players association.

South Africa women in Sri Lanka

South Africa in New Zealand

Zimbabwe in Bangladesh

2014 ICC World Cricket League Division Three

Points table

Final Placings

November

Sri Lanka in India

West Indies women in Australia

South Africa in Australia

Hong Kong vs PNG in Australia

New Zealand vs Pakistan in the United Arab Emirates

South Africa women in India

Hong Kong vs Nepal in Sri Lanka

England in Sri Lanka

2014 ICC East Asia-Pacific Men's Championship

Afghanistan in the United Arab Emirates

December

India in Australia

  Originally scheduled for 4–8 December. Postponed following the death of Australian cricketer Phillip Hughes.

West Indies in South Africa

Sri Lanka in New Zealand

January

2014–15 Dubai Triangular Series

Sri Lanka women vs Pakistan women in UAE

2014–15 Carlton Mid Triangular Series

2015 ICC World Cricket League Division Two

Points table

Final placings

2015 ACC Twenty20 Cup

Points table

Final placings

Pakistan in New Zealand

February

England women in New Zealand

2015 Cricket World Cup

Group stage

Knockout

March

South Africa women vs Pakistan women in UAE

2015 ICC Africa Twenty20 Championship

Points table

Final placings

April

England in West Indies

Pakistan in Bangladesh

References

External links
 2014/15 season on ESPN Cricinfo
 2014/15 Cricket Schedule

 
2014 in cricket
2015 in cricket